Rippert is a surname. Notable people with the surname include:

 Guillaume Rippert (born 1985), French footballer
 Hans-Rolf Rippert, better known as Ivan Rebroff (1931–2008), German singer
 Ulrich Rippert (born 1951), German politician of Trotskyism

See also
 Eric Ripert (born 1965), French chef in New York